Bottrop – Recklinghausen III is an electoral constituency (German: Wahlkreis) represented in the Bundestag. It elects one member via first-past-the-post voting. Under the current constituency numbering system, it is designated as constituency 125. It is located in the Ruhr region of North Rhine-Westphalia, comprising the city of Bottrop and western parts of the Recklinghausen district.

Bottrop – Recklinghausen III was created for the inaugural 1949 federal election. Since 2009, it has been represented by Michael Gerdes of the Social Democratic Party (SPD).

Geography
Bottrop – Recklinghausen III is located in the Ruhr region of North Rhine-Westphalia. As of the 2021 federal election, it comprises the independent city of Bottrop as well as the municipalities of Dorsten and Gladbeck from the Recklinghausen district.

History
Bottrop – Recklinghausen III was created in 1949, then known as Gladbeck – Bottrop. From 1965 through 1976, it was named Bottrop – Gladbeck. From 1980 through 1998, it was named Bottrop – Recklinghausen IV. It acquired its current name in the 2002 election. In the 1949 election, it was North Rhine-Westphalia constituency 43 in the numbering system. From 1953 through 1961, it was number 102. From 1965 through 1976, it was number 101. From 1980 through 1998, it was number 95. From 2002 through 2009, it was number 126. Since 2013, it has been number 125.

Originally, the constituency comprised the independent cities of Bottrop and Gladbeck. Gladbeck was incorporated into the Recklinghausen district in 1976, but the constituency's borders did not change. In the 2002 election, it acquired the municipality of Dorsten from Recklinghausen district.

Members
The constituency has been held by the Social Democratic Party (SPD) during all but three Bundestag terms since 1949. It was first represented by Wilhelm Tenhagen of the SPD from 1949 to 1953. Johann Harnischfeger of the Christian Democratic Union (CDU) won it in 1953 and served three terms. Johann Wuwer regained it for the SPD in 1965 and served until 1980. Franz-Josef Mertens was then representative from 1980 to 1994, when he was succeeded by Dieter Grasedieck. In 2009, Michael Gerdes was elected representative. He was re-elected in 2013, 2017, and 2021.

Election results

2021 election

2017 election

2013 election

2009 election

References

Federal electoral districts in North Rhine-Westphalia
1949 establishments in West Germany
Constituencies established in 1949
Bottrop
Recklinghausen (district)